Nonthawat Rak-ok (born 13 September 1996) is a Thai professional footballer who plays as an attacking midfielder for Thai League 2 club Kasetsart.

References

External links

1996 births
Living people
Nonthawat Rak-ok
Nonthawat Rak-ok
Association football midfielders
Nonthawat Rak-ok
Nonthawat Rak-ok